Itaubal ( also Itaubal do Piririm) is a municipality located in the southeast of the state of Amapá in Brazil.

History
Itaubal was built on the right bank of the Piririm River. First reports of habitation date from 1935. In 1940, more migrants settled in the village. In 1992, it became an independent municipality. The economy is based on forestry, subsistence farming and livestock.

It takes its name from the itaúba (Mezilaurus itauba), a valuable species of laurel. The tree was once found in great abundance in the region, but is now endangered. Itaubal is bordered to the southeast by the delta of the Amazon River, and surrounded by Macapá to the southwest, west, and north.

References

External links
 Official site (in Portuguese)
 

Municipalities in Amapá
Populated places in Amapá